Chirosia inspinata is a species of fly from the Chirosia genus,  Anthomyiidae family, described by Masayoshi Suwa in 1983. According to Catalogue of Life The species of Chirosia inspinata does not have known subspecies.

References

Anthomyiidae
Insects described in 1983